Kerstin Förster (née Pieloth, born 9 November 1965 in Cottbus) is a German rower.

In October 1986, she was awarded a Patriotic Order of Merit in gold (first class) for her sporting success. 

She married Olaf Förster during the winter break between the 1987 and 1988 rowing seasons. He also won a gold medal at the rowing competition at the 1988 Summer Olympics.

References 

 

1965 births
Living people
Sportspeople from Cottbus
People from Bezirk Cottbus
East German female rowers
Rowers at the 1988 Summer Olympics
Olympic gold medalists for East Germany
Olympic rowers of East Germany
Olympic medalists in rowing
World Rowing Championships medalists for East Germany
Medalists at the 1988 Summer Olympics
Recipients of the Patriotic Order of Merit in gold